Margins is a 2022 Italian comedy film directed by Niccolò Falsetti.

The film premiered at the 37th International Critics' Week of the 79th Venice Film Festival, and was released in Italy on 8 September 2022.

Cast
Francesco Turbanti as Michele
Emanuele Linfatti as Edoardo
Matteo Creatini as Iacopo
Valentina Carnelutti as Tiziana
Nicola Rignanese as Adriano Melis
Paolo Cioni as Paolo Bassi
Aurora Malianni as Alice
Silvia D'Amico as Margherita
Zerocalcare as himself (voice only)

References

External links

2022 films
2020s Italian-language films
2022 comedy films
Films set in Grosseto
Italian comedy films
Punk films
2020s Italian films
Rai Cinema films
Fandango (Italian company) films